These lists of animated feature films compile animated feature films from around the world and are organized alphabetically under the year of release (the year the completed film was first released to the public). Theatrical releases as well as made-for-TV (TV) and direct-to-video (V) movies of all types of animation are included. Currently, the lists don't recognize one release form from another.

In order to qualify for these lists, films must be "over 40 minutes long and have animation in at least 75% of their running time, or have at least 40 minutes of animation in total". These lists use the American Film Institute, Academy of Motion Picture Arts and Sciences and British Film Institute definitions of a feature film. For animated films under 40 minutes, see List of animated short films. For marionette films like Team America: World Police, or films featuring non-animated puppets, see . Primarily live-action films with heavy use of special effects are also included.

Lists by decade

List of animated feature films before 1940
List of animated feature films of the 1940s
List of animated feature films of the 1950s
List of animated feature films of the 1960s
List of animated feature films of the 1970s
List of animated feature films of the 1980s
List of animated feature films of the 1990s
List of animated feature films of the 2000s
List of animated feature films of the 2010s
List of animated feature films of the 2020s

Lists by studio
List of Universal theatrical animated feature films
List of DreamWorks Animation productions
List of Illumination films
List of Disney theatrical animated feature films
List of Walt Disney Animation Studios films
List of Pixar films
List of 20th Century Studios theatrical animated feature films
List of Blue Sky Studios productions
List of Warner Bros. theatrical animated feature films
List of MGM theatrical animated feature films
List of Paramount theatrical animated feature films
List of Columbia theatrical animated feature films
List of Sony Pictures Animation productions
List of The Weinstein Company animated films
List of Lionsgate theatrical animated feature films
List of Laika theatrical animated feature films
List of Aardman theatrical animated feature films
List of Ghibli theatrical animated feature films
List of Cartoon Saloon theatrical animated feature films
List of Netflix Animation theatrical animated feature films

See also

 Best Animated Feature Film
 Adult animation
 Animated television series
 History of animation
Lists of American theatrical animated feature films
 List of adult animated films
 List of adult animated series
 List of animated package films
 List of animated short film series
 Lists of animated television series
 List of animation studios
 List of Chinese animated films
 List of computer-animated films
 List of Korean animated films
 List of lost or unfinished animated films
 List of stop-motion films
 List of anime films
 List of Flash animated films

External links

 Spanish animated features
 List of Hungarian animated feature films
 Animation feature films produced and released in Western and Central Europe
 List of Russian animated films
 The Big Cartoon DataBase and Forum
 List of animated features theatrically released in the US, compiled by Jerry Beck
 a shorter list of recent and upcoming Russian features (from CGwiki)
 Danish animated features
 List of French animated films
 List of French and Belgium animated feature films
 List of Czech animated films
 Toonarific
 British animated features
 The Big movie DataBase and Forum

Feature
Lists of films by technology